Banksia ser. Prostratae is a taxonomic series in the genus Banksia, a genus of iconic Australian wildflowers. It consists of six closely related species in section Banksia, all endemic to Western Australia, with a prostrate habit.

Species
Banksia ser. Prostratae consists of the following species:

References

External links

 ser. Prostratae
Eudicots of Western Australia
Plant series